WVBY is a public radio formatted broadcast radio station licensed to Beckley, West Virginia, serving Central Southern West Virginia.  WVBY is owned and operated by West Virginia Educational Broadcasting Authority.

Translators
In addition to the main station, WVBY is relayed by three FM translators to widen its broadcast area.  All three translators are owned and operated by West Virginia Educational Broadcasting Authority.

References

External links
West Virginia Public Broadcasting Online

NPR member stations
VBY
Beckley, West Virginia